SS Samuel G. Howe was a Liberty ship built in the United States during World War II. She was named after Samuel G. Howe, a nineteenth century American physician, abolitionist, and an advocate of education for the blind.

Construction 
Samuel G. Howe was laid down on 7 September 1944, under a Maritime Commission (MARCOM) contract, MC hull 2324, by J.A. Jones Construction, Panama City, Florida; sponsored by Mrs. Jimmy Mann, wife of plant superintendent, and launched on 17 October 1944.

History
She was allocated to Isbrandstsen Steamship Co. Inc., 30 October 1944. On 8 September 1948, she was laid up in the National Defense Reserve Fleet, Mobile, Alabama.

She was sold for scrapping, 17 January 1969, to Union Minerals and Alloys Corp., for $40,125. She was withdrawn from the fleet, 27 January 1969.

References

Bibliography 

 
 
 
 

 

Liberty ships
Ships built in Panama City, Florida
1944 ships
Mobile Reserve Fleet